Edmond Richard (6 January 1927, Paris – 5 June 2018) was a French cinematographer.

Selected works
The Trial (1962)
Chimes at Midnight (1965)
Manon 70 (1968)
The Discreet Charm of the Bourgeoisie (1972)
The Phantom of Liberty (1974)
That Obscure Object of Desire (1977)
Les Misérables (1982) - for which he was nominated for a César Award
Mayrig (1991)
A Star for Two (1991)
Bonsoir (1994)

References

External links

1927 births
2018 deaths
Cinematographers from Paris